Althaf Indie Alrizky (born 6 January 2003) is an Indonesian professional footballer who plays as a winger for Liga 1 club Persis Solo.

Club career

Persis Solo
He was signed for Persis Solo to play in Liga 1 in the 2022 season. Althaf made his league debut on 31 July 2022 in a match against Persija Jakarta at the Patriot Candrabhaga Stadium, Bekasi.

Career statistics

Club

Notes

Honours

Individual
 Liga 1 U-16 Best Player: 2019

References

External links
 Althaf Indie at Soccerway
 Althaf Indie at Liga Indonesia

2003 births
Living people
People from Bekasi
Sportspeople from West Java
Indonesian footballers
Persis Solo players
Liga 1 (Indonesia) players
Indonesia youth international footballers
Association football midfielders